Dr. Jorge Alberto da Conceição Hagedorn Rangel  was a Portuguese civil servant in Macau and served in the post of Secretary for Public Administration, Education and Youth.

See also
 Politics of Macau

References

Living people
Year of birth missing (living people)

Government ministers of Macau
Portuguese civil servants